Zophos baudoni is a species of air-breathing land snail, terrestrial pulmonate gastropod mollusk in the family Haplotrematidae.

Distribution 
 Guadeloupe - Zophos baudoni was described by Petit de la Saussaye from Guadeloupe.
 Dominica - Robert John Lechmere Guppy (1868) expressed some doubts whether the Dominican specimens belonged to species Zophos baudoni. Ramnath & Fields (2002) were of the same opinion, considering it possibly new to science.

Ecology 
Zophos baudoni lives on the rainforest floor.

It is carnivorous and it feeds on earthworms and immature Pleurodonte specimens.

References
This article incorporates CC-BY-3.0 text from the reference

External links 

Haplotrematidae
Gastropods described in 1853